Geography of aging or gerontological geography is an emerging field of knowledge of human geography that analyzes the socio-spatial implications of aging of the population from the understanding of the relationships between the physical-social environment and the elderly, at different scales, micro (City, region, country), etc.

Since the 1970s in a number of developed countries such as the United States, Canada, the United Kingdom, Germany, Sweden, France, Spain, Australia, New Zealand and Japan, there have been increasing studies focusing on the understanding of spatial patterns of aging population, as well as aspects related to residential changes and provision of health and social services. Among the geographers of aging is S. Harper, who identified the phenomenon of aging associated with the social construction of old age and the processes of residential mobility of this group to the urban periphery, mainly nursing homes and sheltered housing.

The contribution of geographers of aging, such as Graham D. Rowles, SM. Golant, S. Harper, G. Laws, are contributing to environmental gerontology by understanding the environmental aspects of gerontology in developed and developing countries. Also in Spain, some geographers, such as Gloria Fernández-Mayoralas, Fermina Rojo-Pérez and Vicente Rodríguez-Rodríguez, have made outstanding contributions to the study of residential strategies, access to health services, and, in general, quality of Life of the elderly, as well as the impacts of Northern European retirees on the Costa del Sol, Spain.

In Latin America and Spain, Diego Sánchez-González has shed light on the deepening of issues such as the physical-built and social environment and the quality of life of the elderly; the importance of the natural environment (therapeutic natural landscape) on active and healthy aging in the place; residential strategies for the maintenance of the elderly in the communities; the socio-environmental vulnerability of the elderly in the face of climate change; as well as issues related to the attachment to the place (identity and public space); elderly people with disabilities and social exclusion; leisure and tourism of elderly; and the planning of gerontological and geriatric services.

References 

 Abellán García, A., (1999), “Movilidad residencial y género entre las personas de edad: una aproximación a las estrategias residenciales en Madrid”, Documents d’anàlisi geogràfica, núm. 34, pp. 143-159.
 Andrews, Gavin J.; Phillips, David R. (2005). Ageing and Place: Perspectives, Policy, Practice. Routledge.
 Escudero, JM., (2003), “Los viejos en su casa, en su ciudad”, Scripta Nova. Revista electrónica de geografía y ciencias sociales, vol. VII, núm. 146 (203), Universidad de Barcelona, Barcelona.
 Eyles, J., (2004-, “The geography of everyday life”, in D. Gregory y R. Walford (eds): Horizons in human geography, London, MacMillan, pp. 102-117.
 García Ballesteros, A., Ortiz-Álvarez, M.I., y Gómez Escobar, M.C. (2003), “El envejecimiento de las poblaciones: los casos de España y México”, Anales de Geografía de la Universidad Complutense, N° 23, pp. 75-102.
 Golant, SM., (2002), “The housing problems of the future elderly population”. Commission on Affordable Housing and Health Facility Needs for seniors in the 21st Century (ed.): A quiet crisis in America: A report to Congress. Washington, DC: US Government Printing Office, pp. 189-370.
 Golant, SM. y Salmon, JR., (2004), “The unequal availability of affordable assisted living units in Florida’s Counties”, Journal of Applied Gerontology, Dec., vol. 23, pp. 349-369.
 Hanson, S. y Pratt, G., (1992), “Dynamic dependencies: A geographic investigation of local labour markets”, Economic Geography, vol. 68, núm. 4, October, pp. 373-405.
 Harper, S. y Laws, G., (1995), “Rethinking the geography of ageing”, Progress in Human Geography, núm. 19, SAGE Publications, London, pp. 199-221.
 Katz, C., and J. Monk, (eds.) (1993). Full circles. London: Routledge.
 Laws, G. (1994). Aging, contested meanings, and the built environment. Environment and Planning A, 26:1787–802.
 López Jiménez, J.J. (1993), El proceso de envejecimiento urbano y sus implicaciones en el municipio de Madrid. Tesis doctoral, Universidad Complutense, Madrid.
 Peet, JR. y Rowles, GD., (1974), “Geographical aspects of aging”, Geographical Review, vol. LXIV, núm. 2, The American Geographical Society of Nueva York, Nueva York, pp. 287-289.
 Phillips, D. et al., (2005), "The Impacts of Dwelling Conditions on Older Persons' Psychological Well-being in Hong Kong: The Mediating Role of Residential Satisfaction", Social Science & Medicine, 60, 12, June 2005, pp. 2785-2797.
 Puga González, MD. y Abellán García, A., (2007), “Las escalas territoriales del envejecimiento”, Semata: Ciencias sociais e humanidades, núm. 18, pp. 121-141.
 Rodríguez, V. et al., (2003), “Envejecimiento y salud: diez años de investigación en el CSIC”, en Revista Multidisciplinar de Gerontología, vol. 13, nº 1, Nexus, Barcelona, pp. 43-46.
 Rojo, F., Fernández-Mayoralas, G., Pozo, E., (2000), “Envejecer en casa: los predictores de la satisfacción con la casa, el barrio y el vecindario como componentes de la calidad de vida de los mayores en Madrid”, Revista Multidisciplinar de Gerontología, 10, 4, pp. 222-233.
 Rowles, Graham D. (1978). Prisoners of space? Exploring the geographical experience of older people. Boulder, C., Westview Press.
 Rowles, Graham D.; Chaudhury, Habib (2005). Home and identity in late life: international perspectives. Nueva York: Springer Publishing Company.
 Rowles, Graham D.; Bernard, Miriam (2012). Environmental Gerontology: Making Meaningful Places in Old Age. Nueva York: Springer Publishing Company.
 Sánchez-González, D. (2005). The situation of older people in the city of Granada. Geographical Survey. Granada: Universidad de Granada. p. 2089. .
 Sánchez-González, D. (2009). «Environmental context and spatial experience of aging in place: the case of Granada». Papeles de Población 15 (60): 175-213. ISSN 1405-7425.
 Sánchez-González, D. (2011). Geografía del envejecimiento y sus implicaciones en Gerontología. Contribuciones geográficas a la Gerontología Ambiental y el envejecimiento de la población. Saarbrücken: Editorial Académica Española-Lambert Academic Publishing. p. 264. .
 Sánchez-González, D. (2015): "Physical-social environments and aging population from environmental gerontology and geography. Socio-spatial implications in Latin America", Revista de Geografía Norte Grande, Nº 60, Mayo 2015, pp. 97-114
 Sánchez-González, D.; Rodríguez-Rodríguez, V. (2016). Environmental Gerontology in Europe and Latin America. Policies and perspectives on environment and aging. New York: Springer Publishing Company. p. 306. .
 Smith, GC., (1998), “Residential separation and patterns of interaction between elderly parents and their adult children”. Progress in Human Geography, Jun, vol. 22, pp. 368-384.
 Stewart, JE., (2003), “Geographic Information Systems in Community-Based Gerontological Research and Practice”, Journal of Applied Gerontology, vol. 22, nº 1, pp. 134-151.
 Warnes, AM., (1990), “Geographical questions in gerontology: needed directions for research”, Progress in Human Geography, núm. 14, SAGE Publications, London, pp. 24-56.

Geography
Ageing